This is a list of flag bearers who have represented Iran at the Olympics.

Flag bearers carry the national flag of their country at the opening ceremony of the Olympic Games.

See also
Iran at the Olympics

References

External links
Iran NOC

Iran at the Olympics
Iran
Olympic flagbearers